Tadeusz Baranowski may refer to:

Tadeusz Baranowski (artist) (born 1945), Polish comic book artist
Tadeusz Baranowski (chemist) (1910–1993), Polish chemist